"Twisting at the Woodchopper's Ball" was the first made in Canada single to top the International Charts.

Ronn Metcalfe released an LP named after the title track, "Twistin' at the Woodchopper's Ball", which garnered him a gold record. The album was a good example of high calibre musicianship combined with well written arrangements. Metcalfe would ride the success of this album to create a rock and roll scene in Niagara, Canada. Metcalfe, "Canada's King of Swing", paid $7000 to produce the LP, including the single release from the album, which was chosen "Pick of the Week" in Cash Box magazine. Metcalfe said of the song, "This is the way back to the big bands."

"Twisting at the Woodchopper's Ball" was a hit recording written by Ronn Metcalfe, based on Woody Herman's "Woodchopper's Ball" (1939). It was recorded by the 19 piece Ronn Metcalfe Orchestra (of St. Catharines, Canada) on the Barry label and distributed by Quality Records Ltd., of Toronto (released on  February 19, 1962). It rose to the top of the charts in Canada (Hit Parade Charts), and made the WLS (Chicago) Top 40 in 1962.

References

1962 singles
Canadian rock songs
1962 songs